Brother Marie-Victorin, F.S.C. (April 3, 1885 – July 15, 1944), was a Canadian member of Brothers of the Christian Schools and a noted botanist in Quebec, Canada. He is known as the father of the Botanical Garden of Montreal.

Biography 
He was born Joseph-Louis-Conrad Kirouac to Cyrille Kirouac, a flower merchant, and Philomène Luneau in Kingsey Falls, Quebec. Prior to taking religious vows and becoming Brother Marie-Victorin, he was known as Conrad.

Although Brother Victorin is on record as having suggested that Montreal build its own botanical gardens as early as 1919, the Garden was not authorized until 1929 when Montreal Mayor Camillien Houde approved it, with construction beginning in 1931.

Subsequent administrations, both municipal and provincial, opposed the Garden as a boondoggle; however, Brother Victorin continued to champion its cause, promoting it at every opportunity, leading specimen-collection expeditions, recruiting Henry Teuscher as its designer, and  protecting it from being converted into a military flight school, even during the Second World War.

Brother Victorin is also known for his writings: his Flore laurentienne is a botanical record of all species indigenous to southern Quebec, and was the first such record to be compiled. He also wrote the preface to an historical biography of another fifth cousin, Zephirin Paquet. Sa famille, sa Vie, son Oeuvre. Essai de Monographie Familiale, par frère Alcas.

Brother Victorin died in Montreal in a car accident in July 1944, and he was entombed at the Notre Dame des Neiges Cemetery in Montreal. A building at the Université de Montréal, where he had taught botany, was subsequently named for him.

Legacy
The Marie-Victorin rose, developed by Agriculture and Agri-Food Canada, was named in his honour.

To honour the centennial of his birth in 1985, a park was established in his hometown of Kingsey Falls, named Parc Marie-Victorin. Originally 3 acres, it has expanded to nearly 30 acres, with volunteers and a small permanent staff. The park has been a leader in the province for horticultural development in the green movement.

In the early 1990s, a private high school in Montréal was opened and named for him. The school is still open but its name was changed in 2006.

Brother Victorin has been inducted as a member of the Canadian Science and Engineering Hall of Fame

He is fictionalized as a central character in André Forcier's 2019 film Forgotten Flowers (Les fleurs oubliées), in which he is portrayed by Yves Jacques.

Gallery

References

External links

Kirouac Family Association Inc. Bilingual Web Site
Retrospective of Kirouac's life, at l'Université de Montréal (in French)

1885 births
1944 deaths
People from Centre-du-Québec
De La Salle Brothers
Roman Catholic religious brothers
Academic staff of the Université de Montréal
20th-century Canadian botanists
Persons of National Historic Significance (Canada)
Accidental deaths in Quebec
Road incident deaths in Canada
Burials in Quebec
Canadian people of Breton descent
Catholic clergy scientists
Burials at Notre Dame des Neiges Cemetery